Global Mall Linkou A9 is a shopping mall in Linkou District, New Taipei, Taiwan that opened on May 25, 2017. It is the eighth store of Global Mall.

See also
 List of tourist attractions in Taiwan
 Global Mall Nangang Station
 Global Mall Banqiao Station
 Global Mall Taoyuan A8
 Global Mall Xinzuoying Station
 Global Mall Pingtung
 Global Mall Zhonghe

References

External links

2017 establishments in Taiwan
Shopping malls in New Taipei
Shopping malls established in 2017